The list of acts of the 74th United States Congress includes all Acts of Congress and ratified treaties by the 74th United States Congress, which lasted from January 3, 1935 to January 3, 1937.

Acts include public and private laws, which are enacted after being passed by Congress and signed by the President, however if the President vetoes a bill it can still be enacted by a two-thirds vote in both houses. The Senate alone considers treaties, which are ratified by a two-thirds vote.

Summary of actions

Public laws

The 74th congress passed 849 Public Laws:

Private laws
The 74th congress passed 704 private laws.

References

 
74